SRVS National Higher Secondary School is a state board syllabus school in Dharmapuram, Karaikal district, Pondicherry in India. It is a higher secondary school.

SRVS was founded by Mr. Sellaiyan in 2003. The founders day is celebrated in his birthday March 9. Prizes also distributed for competition held in the year earlier, on the day.

The school has 65 teachers and 3500 students

References

High schools and secondary schools in Puducherry